Stanisław Stefanek (7 May 1936 – 17 January 2020) was a Polish prelate of the Catholic Church.

Born in the village of Majdan Sobieszczański, Stefanek was ordained to the priesthood on 28 June 1959.

He became vicar general of the Society of Christ. He was named an auxiliary bishop of Szczecin-Kamień and titular bishop of Forum Popilii in 1980.

Pope John Paul II appointed him Bishop of Łomża on 26 October 1996.

Pope Benedict XVI accepted his resignation and named Janusz Stepnowski to succeed him on 11 November 2011. 

Stefanek died on 17 January 2020 in Lublin at the age of 83, and he was buried in the Łomża cathedral on 23 January.

References

1936 births
2020 deaths
21st-century Roman Catholic bishops in Poland
20th-century Roman Catholic bishops in Poland
People from Lublin County